Linwood Lake is a lake in Anoka County, Minnesota, in the United States. The name is thought to be derived from linwood trees.

References

Lakes of Minnesota
Lakes of Anoka County, Minnesota